Kilfinaghta is a civil parish of County Clare, Ireland, located to the east of Sixmilebridge and northeast of Shannon.

Geography
The civil parish of Kilfinaghta lies in the barony of Bunratty Lower. It is in the southeastern part of the county and is bordered by Clonlea to the northeast, O'Brien's Bridge to the east, St. Munchin's to the southeast, Killeely to the southeast, Kilfintinan to the south, Feenagh to the southwest and Kilmurry to the northwest. It is divided into 31 townlands:  

Ardmaclancy 
Ballycullen 
Ballymulcashel 
Ballynevan
Ballyroe 
Ballysheen Beg 
Ballysheen More 
Bunnabinnia North
Bunnabinnia South 	
Cappaghcastle 	
Cappaghlodge 	
Cappagh North
Cappagh South 
Cappanalaght 
Castlecrine 	
Castlelake
Cloonanass 	
Clogga 
Coolycasey 	
Corlea
Curraghkilleen 
Fortwilliam 	
Ieverstown 	
Kilnacreagh
Moygalla 	
Mountcashel  
Mountievers 	
Pollagh
Reaskcamoge 
Sooreeny 	
Sixmilebridge

References

Civil parishes of County Clare